Lyria grandidieri is a species of sea snail, a marine gastropod mollusk in the family Volutidae, the volutes.

Description
The length of the shell attains 37 mm.

Distribution
One of the rarest of the Lyria, this marine species is found near New Caledonia.

References

 Bail P. 2002. Two new species of Lyria (Gastropoda: Volutidae) from New Caledonian waters. Novapex 3(4): 133–137
 Bouchet, P.; Fontaine, B. (2009). List of new marine species described between 2002 and 2006. Census of Marine Life

External links

Volutidae
Gastropods described in 2002